Drumkeerin GAA Club is a Gaelic football club in Drumkeeran, north County Leitrim, Ireland. It takes part in competitions organized by Leitrim County Board. The club was formed in 1933. The club colours are maroon and white.

The club is based in the village of Drumkeeran and draws its members predominantly from the parish of Inishmagrath (and also some players from neighbouring areas including Killargue, Killavoggy and Arigna). It is bordered to its south by the Arigna area of north County Roscommon, to the west by Counties Roscommon and Sligo, to the north by fellow Leitrim club Dromahair and to the east by another Leitrim club, Ballinaglera.

Achievements
 Leitrim Junior Football Championship: 3
 1964, 1975, 1985
 Leitrim Minor Football Championship (B Championship): 3
 1993, 1994, 2009

References

Gaelic games clubs in County Leitrim
Gaelic football clubs in County Leitrim